Reutealis is a monotypic plant genus in the family Euphorbiaceae. The single species, Reutealis trisperma is also known as Philippine tung. Reutealis trisperma is endemic to the Philippines and used as a timber species, although the IUCN has classified it with the conservation status 'Vulnerable'.

References

Aleuritideae
Monotypic Euphorbiaceae genera
Endemic flora of the Philippines
Vulnerable plants
Taxa named by Francisco Manuel Blanco
Taxa named by Herbert Kenneth Airy Shaw